BRR may refer to:

 Balanced repeated replication, a statistical technique for estimating sampling variability
 Barra Airport (Scotland) (IATA airport code)
 Barrhead railway station, a Scottish railway station
 Binary Revolution Radio, a hacker internet radio show
 Bit-rate reduction, another term for data compression
 Bit Rate Reduction, a name given to an audio compression scheme used in the SNES
 Blenheim Riverside Railway, a narrow gauge railway in Blenheim, New Zealand
 BMW Rolls-Royce AeroEngines GmbH, in short form BMW Rolls-Royce, a former joint venture company of BMW AG and Rolls-Royce plc
 Book Rights Registry, disburses revenue from Google Book Search
 Brazilian cruzeiro real, the short-lived currency between August 1993 and June 1994, that had ISO 4217 code BRR
 BRR dances
 Business Readiness Rating
 Badan Rehabilitasi dan Rekonstruksi or BRR NAD-Nias, an Agency for Rehabilitation and Reconstruction of Aceh and Nias
 Black Rose Rollers, a roller derby league from Hanover, Pennsylvania

See also
Brrr (disambiguation)
Bir (disambiguation)